Coastal defence ship is a catchall category for warships with overlapping characteristics and duties, grouped here for purposes of concision and comparison. They included ships variously called coastal defence ships, coastal battleships,  German  Küstenpanzerschiff, Kystforsvarsskib, Panserskip; the Dutch Kruiser, Pantserschip and Slagschip; and the Swedish 1:a klass Pansarbåt and Pansarskepp''.

Coastal defence ships were cruiser-sized shallow-draft vessels capable of close to shore littoral and riverine operations. Some had limited blue-water capabilities. Coastal defence ships differed from earlier monitors by having a higher freeboard and usually both higher speed and secondary armament.  Their construction and appearance was similar to miniaturized pre-dreadnought battleships.  They carried heavier armour than cruisers or gunboats of equivalent size, were typically equipped with a main armament of two or four heavy and several lighter guns in turrets or casemates, and could steam at a higher speed than most monitors.

In service they were mainly used as movable coastal artillery rather than instruments of sea control or fleet engagements like the battleships operated by blue-water navies. Apart from specially built coastal defence ships, some navies used various obsolescent ships in this role. The Royal Navy deployed four  as guardships in the Humber at the start of the First World War. Such ships tended to be near the end of their service lives and while generally considered no longer fit for front-line service, they were still powerful enough for defensive duties in reserve situations.

The List of ships of World War II contains major military vessels of the war, arranged alphabetically and by type. The list includes armed vessels that served during the war and in the immediate aftermath, inclusive of localized ongoing combat operations, garrison surrenders, post-surrender occupation, colony re-occupation, troop  and prisoner repatriation, to the end of 1945. For smaller vessels, see also List of World War II ships of less than 1000 tons. Some uncompleted Axis ships are included, out of historic interest. Ships are designated to the country under which they operated for the longest period of the World War II, regardless of where they were built or previous service history.

References

Bibliography
 

  

coastal defense
World War II coastal defence ships